Ahja Parish was a rural municipality of Estonia, in Põlva County. It had a population of 963 (as of 1.

Settlements

References

External links
 

 
Former municipalities of Estonia